The Oaks is an unincorporated community in Nevada County, California. It lies at an elevation of 2549 feet (777 m).

References

Unincorporated communities in California
Unincorporated communities in Nevada County, California